Stian Rode Gregersen (born 17 May 1995) is a Norwegian professional footballer who plays as a defender and defensive midfielder for  club Bordeaux and the Norway national team.

Club career
Gregersen was brought to Molde from Clausenengen in 2012. In March 2015, Gregersen joined Kristiansund on loan for the 2015 season.

16 February 2017, Gregersen signed a new contract with Molde, Which will keep him with the club until 2020.

In February 2019, Gregersen joined Elfsborg on loan until the end of the 2019 season.

On 31 August 2021, Gregersen left Molde to sign for Bordeaux.

International career
Gregersen made his debut for the Norway national team on 27 March 2021 in a World Cup qualifier against Turkey.

Career statistics

Club

Honours
Molde
 Tippeligaen: 2014

References

1995 births
Living people
Sportspeople from Kristiansund
Norwegian footballers
Association football midfielders
Norway international footballers
Norway youth international footballers
Eliteserien players
Norwegian First Division players
Norwegian Second Division players
Allsvenskan players
Ligue 1 players
Ligue 2 players
Molde FK players
Kristiansund BK players
IF Elfsborg players
FC Girondins de Bordeaux players
Norwegian expatriate footballers
Norwegian expatriate sportspeople in Sweden
Expatriate footballers in Sweden
Norwegian expatriate sportspeople in France
Expatriate footballers in France